Roger Lumbala (born 1958) is an MP in the Democratic Republic of the Congo, representing the Rally of Congolese Democrats and Nationalists. He is a former rebel leader who was backed by Uganda during the 1998–2002 Congolese civil war.
He was arrested in Paris and is suspected of torture and cannibalism.

References

Living people
1958 births
Rally of Congolese Democrats and Nationalists politicians
Candidates for President of the Democratic Republic of the Congo